The Arte de la lengua mexicana y castellana is a grammar of the Nahuatl language in Spanish by Alonso de Molina. It was published in Mexico in 1571, the same year as his monumental dictionary, Vocabulario en lengua castellana y mexicana.

The grammar is rudimentary, but does contain some insights on certain points, especially on pronunciation and orthography.

The Arte was republished in a facsimile edition in 1945.

References

External links
Digital reproduction of Arte de la lengua mexicana y castellana 

1571 books
Nahuatl dictionaries and grammars